Charlie Howard (27 September 1854 – 20 May 1929) was an English cricketer. Howard was a right-handed batsman, although his bowling style is unknown. He was born at Chichester, Sussex.

Howard made his first-class debut for Sussex against Surrey in 1874 at the County Ground, Hove. He made 21 further first-class appearances for Sussex, the last of which came against Hampshire in 1882. In his 22 first-class appearances for Sussex, he scored 508 runs at an average of 17.14, with a high score of 106. He made this score against Hampshire in 1880, with this score being his only first-class century, as well as being the only time he passed fifty. He also made a single first-class appearance for a United Eleven against the touring Australian in 1882, which was his final first-class match.

He died at the city of his birth on 20 May 1929.

References

External links
Charlie Howard at ESPNcricinfo
Charlie Howard at CricketArchive

1854 births
1929 deaths
Sportspeople from Chichester
English cricketers
Sussex cricketers